Aude Compan (born 3 March 1993) is a French sailor. She and Sarah Steyaert placed 6th in the 49erFX event at the 2016 Summer Olympics.

References

External links 
 
 
 
 

1993 births
Living people
French female sailors (sport)
Olympic sailors of France
Sailors at the 2016 Summer Olympics – 49er FX
Sportspeople from Hérault
People from Sète
21st-century French women